Jan Drewes Achenbach (20 August 1935 – 22 August 2020) was a professor emeritus (Walter P. Murphy Professor and Distinguished McCormick School Professor) at Northwestern University. Achenbach was born in the northern region of the Netherlands, in Leeuwarden. He studied aeronautics at Delft University of Technology, which he finished with a M.Sc. degree in 1959. Thereafter, he went to the United States, Stanford University, where he received his Ph.D. degree in 1962. After working for a year as a preceptor at Columbia University, he was then appointed as assistant professor at Northwestern University.

Achenbach has developed methods for flaw detection and characterization by using contact transducers, imaging techniques and laser-based ultrasonics. He has also developed methods for thin-layer characterization by acoustic microscopy. Work is both analytical and experimental in nature, with extensive cooperation with investigators from other universities and from industrial organizations on theoretical experimental projects. Work in fracture mechanics has been primarily on dynamic fracture. He also carried out research on structural acoustics and on the mechanical behavior of composite materials. 

Achenbach is the founding editor-in-chief of Wave Motion. He was editor in chief from the journal's establishment in 1979, until 2012.

Honors and awards

Awards
 2012 – ASME Medal by the American Society of Mechanical Engineers
 2010 – Theodore von Karman Medal by the American Society of Civil Engineers
 2005 – National Medal of Science
 2003 – National Medal of Technology
 2001 – William Prager Medal by the Society of Engineering Science
 1997 – Outstanding Service Award by the American Academy of Mechanics
 1996 – McDonnell-Douglas Aerospace Model of Excellence Award by McDonnell-Douglas Aerospace
 1992 – Timoshenko Medal by the American Society of Mechanical Engineers
 1975 – Curtis W. McGraw Research Award by the American Society of Engineering Education

Memberships and fellowships
 Member of the National Academy of Sciences
 Member of the National Academy of Engineering
 Fellow of the American Academy of Arts and Sciences
 Honorary Member of the American Society of Mechanical Engineers
 Fellow of the American Association for the Advancement of Science (1994)
 Fellow of the Japan Society for the Promotion of Science
 Corresponding Member of the Royal Netherlands Academy of Arts and Sciences (1999)
 Fellow of the Acoustical Society of America
 Fellow of the American Academy of Mechanics

Books

References

Footnotes

Other

 
  – A volume in honour of Jan D. Achenbach

External links
 
 

1935 births
2020 deaths
Dutch acoustical engineers
Members of the Royal Netherlands Academy of Arts and Sciences
Members of the United States National Academy of Sciences
Members of the United States National Academy of Engineering
Fellows of the American Academy of Arts and Sciences
People from Leeuwarden
Delft University of Technology alumni
Dutch emigrants to the United States
Stanford University School of Engineering alumni
Columbia University staff
Northwestern University faculty
ASME Medal recipients
Fellows of the Acoustical Society of America
National Medal of Science laureates
National Medal of Technology recipients
American scientists